Laferrière (or Laferriere) is a French habitational surname connected to a multitude of settlements called La Ferrière (historically indicating the presence of artisanal mining of iron ore) that is also common in French America.

Notable people with this name include:

Alexandre Laferrière (born 1973), Canadian screenwriter
Dany Laferrière (born 1953), Haitian-born Canadian novelist, journalist, poet, screenwriter, and filmmaker
Édouard Laferrière (1841–1901), French lawyer and politician
Hubert Julien-Laferrière (born 1966), French economist and politician
Joseph Edward Laferrière (born 1955), American botanist
Kimberly Laferriere (born 1984), Canadian actor
Victor Julien-Laferrière (born 1990), French cellist
Yves Laferrière (1943–2020), Canadian actor and composer

See also
Ferreira (surname), a related Portuguese surname
Herrera (surname), a related Spanish surname

References

French-language surnames